Nangō-Nana-Chōme Station (南郷7丁目駅) is a Sapporo Municipal Subway station in Shiroishi-ku, Sapporo, Hokkaido, Japan. The station number is T14.

Platforms

Surrounding area
 Sapporo Shiroishi Ward Gymnasium
 Sapporo Shiroishi Fire Station
 Nango Shiraishi Police Station
 Shiraishi Sakae-Dori Post Office
 Koto Hospital
 Asahi Beer Factory (Asahi Breweries)
 HONGO Shopping Street
 Tokou Store, Nango Nana-Chome Branch
 Nangodori Shopping District promotion association
 Donguri,(baked bread chain) Head office
 Morimoto, Nango-Dori branch
 North Pacific Bank, Hongo Branch Shiraishi
 Nango Shinkin Bank, Sapporo branch

External links

 Sapporo Subway Stations

 

Railway stations in Japan opened in 1982
Railway stations in Sapporo
Sapporo Municipal Subway